The first round of the 2000–01 UEFA Cup began on 14 September 2000. The round included 41 winners from the qualifying round, 16 losing teams from the Champions League 3rd qualifying round, 3 winners of the Intertoto Cup and 36 new entrants. This round narrowed the clubs from 96 to 48 teams for the second round.

Seeding

Matches

|}

1 This match was played at Prater Stadium in Vienna instead of Red Star's home ground in Belgrade due to UEFA deciding to accommodate Leicester City's request in which the English club claimed that "travelling to FR Yugoslavia poses a security risk due to the political situation in the country". UEFA's decision was revealed on 12 September 2000, only nine days before the match was originally scheduled to be played. The sudden decision to not only move the tie to a neutral location but to also postpone it for a week was a highly controversial precedent since no other club drawn to travel to FR Yugoslavia for matches in European competition that season received similar treatment: Viljandi Tulevik, Sliema Wanderers, Dynamo Kyiv, Porto, OFI Crete, and Celta Vigo.

First leg

Second leg

Hertha BSC won 4–1 on aggregate.

Werder Bremen won 6–2 on aggregate.

Kaiserslautern won 3–2 on aggregate.

3–3 on aggregate; Stuttgart won on away goals.

1860 München win 1–0 on aggregate.

Lokomotiv Moscow win 4–2 on aggregate.

Slovan Liberec win 4–3 on aggregate.

Liverpool won 1–0 on aggregate.

Genk won 4–1 on aggregate.

Espanyol won 3–2 on aggregate.

Boavista won 4–2 on aggregate.

Osijek won 2–1 on aggregate.

Internazionale won 7–1 on aggregate.

Parma won 6–0 on aggregate.

Lausanne won 5–2 on aggregate.

Celta Vigo won 1–0 on aggregate.

Red Star Belgrade won 4–2 on aggregate.

Inter Bratislava won 4–1 on aggregate.

Nantes won 6–0 on aggregate.

PAOK won 6–4 on aggregate.

Slavia Prague won 5–0 on aggregate.

Rapid Wien won 4–1 on aggregate.

Ajax won 9–0 on aggregate.

Lillestrøm won 4–3 on aggregate.

Grazer AK won 3–2 on aggregate.

2–2 on aggregate; MTK Budapest won on away goals.

Alavés won 4–3 on aggregate.

Tirol Innsbruck won 5–3 on aggregate.

Club Brugge won 3–0 on aggregate.

Viborg won 1–0 on aggregate.

Celtic won 3–2 on aggregate.

Iraklis won 1–0 on aggregate.

St. Gallen won 2–1 on aggregate.

5–5 on aggregate, Wisła Kraków won 4–3 on penalties.

Rayo Vallecano won 2–1 on aggregate.

Roma won 11–1 on aggregate.

Herfølge won 2–1 on aggregate.

Vitesse won 4–2 on aggregate.

AEK Athens won 4–2 on aggregate.

Porto won 2–1 on aggregate.

Amica Wronki won 5–0 on aggregate.

Halmstad won 4–3 on aggregate.

Feyenoord won 4–1 on aggregate.

Bordeaux won 5–1 on aggregate.

Udinese won 3–0 on aggregate.

Basel won 7–6 on aggregate.

OFI Crete won 6–0 on aggregate.

Dinamo Zagreb won 4–1 on aggregate.

References

External links
First Round Information
RSSSF Page

1